Access Credit Union is a Canadian credit union, formed by multiple mergers of smaller southern Manitoba credit unions, which provides full daily banking services, loans and mortgages, investment services and business banking. At the close of 2021, Access had  in assets and approximately 169,700 members. It has 52 branches across Manitoba. Access is the second-largest credit union in Manitoba and the thirteenth-largest in Canada, excluding Quebec.

Altona Credit Union was organized in 1939, Dufferin Credit Union was formed in 1961, Heartland Credit Union opened its doors for business in 2002 as a result of successful amalgamation with Gretna Credit Union (1943), Plum Coulee Credit Union (1942) and Winkler Credit Union (1940). In 1947, Morden Credit Union was formed eventually amalgamating with Manitou Credit Union and Miami Credit Union. In 2001, Valley Credit Union – formerly Morris CU (1947) and Dominion City CU (1946) amalgamated with Morden CU to form Agassiz Credit Union. Altona Credit Union, Dufferin Credit Union, Heartland Credit Union and Agassiz Credit Union merged in 2009 to form Access Credit Union. Lowe Farm Credit Union (1938) joined in 2010. Community Credit Union and Sanford Credit Union followed in 2013. Access merged with Winnipeg's Crosstown Civic Credit Union in 2021.

Access Credit Union also operates a wholly owned subsidiary in Credential Financial Strategies and is part owner in an insurance subsidiary.

On January 27, 2022, the members of Access Credit Union, Noventis Credit Union and Sunova Credit Union voted to merge.  The merger will legally take place on July 1, 2022, and the new credit union will retain the name Access Credit Union.

Memberships
Central 1 Credit Union
Interac
The Exchange
MasterCard
Cirrus Network
Maestro (debit card)
Deposit Guarantee Corporation of Manitoba
Co-op Network

References

External links
Official website

Credit unions of Manitoba
Banks established in 1940
1940 establishments in Manitoba
Winkler, Manitoba